George G. C. Parker is an American economist, currently the Dean Witter Distinguished Professor Emeritus at Stanford Graduate School of Business.

References

Year of birth missing (living people)
Living people
Stanford University faculty
American economists
Stanford University alumni
Haverford College alumni